Nikephoros II or Nicephorus II may refer to:

 Nikephoros II Phokas (ca. 912–969), Byzantine emperor in 963–969
 Nikephoros II of Constantinople (died 1261), Metropolitan of Ephesus, Patriarch of Constantinople in 1260–1261
 Nikephoros II Orsini (1328–1359), Despot of Epirus in 1335–1340 and 1356–1359